Axinactis inaequalis is a species of bivalve class, and mollusc phylum in the family Glycymerididae.

Description
Color may be white or pale brown, usually with transverse zigzag brown bands. These shells are inequilateral, with large ribs.

Distribution
This species can be found from the Gulf of California to Northern Peru, Panama, and Ecuador.

References

 Coan, E. V.; Valentich-Scott, P. (2012). Bivalve seashells of tropical West America. Marine bivalve mollusks from Baja California to northern Peru. 2 vols, 1258 pp.

Glycymerididae
Bivalves described in 1833